El Turco is Spanish for "the Turk". It is the nickname of:

Abraham Ancer (born 1991), Mexican professional golfer
Julio Asad (born 1953), Argentine former footballer and manager
Omar Asad (born 1971), Argentine football manager and former player and current coach
Nayib Bukele (born 1981), President of El Salvador
Jorge Cafrune (1937–1978), Argentine folklore singer
Álvaro Fayad (1946–1986), Colombian guerrilla
Claudio Husaín (born 1974), Argentine footballer
Hugo Maradona (1969-2021), Argentine footballer and coach
Carlos Menem (1930-2021), Argentine former president and senator
Antonio Mohamed (born 1970), Argentine former footballer and current manager
Marcelo Sajen (1965–2004), Argentine serial rapist

See also
Turk (nickname)

Lists of people by nickname